Adambar  is a village in the Nannilam taluk of Tiruvarur district in the Indian state of Tamil Nadu.

Demographics 

As per the 2001 census, Adambar OR Athambar had a population of 1,609 with 824 males and 785 females. The sex ratio was 953. The literacy rate was 80.74.

Geography 
The village is surrounded by greenery. This village is around 22 km from Tiruvarur and 8 km from Nannilam.

Culture 
Adambar Shri Kothandaramar temple and a 13th century Shiva temple are located in the village. It has historical connection with the Ramayana. Rama vowed to kill Atham the magic deer there, which Sita devi wanted. Kothandaramar Temple is the temple of Sri Ranganathar.

Other temples include Sri Siddhi Vinayaga Temple, Shri Kothandaramar Temple, Lord Siva Temple, Maha Mariamman Temple, and Pidari Amman Temple.

Transport 

Buses travel to Nannilam from Tiruvarur.

References 

Villages in Tiruvarur district